Paulo Adriano Almeida Simões (born 3 March 1977 in Anadia, Aveiro District), known as Adriano, is a Portuguese former footballer who played as a midfielder.

Honours
Brașov
Liga II: 2007–08

Anadia
Terceira Divisão: 2009–10

References

External links

1977 births
Living people
People from Anadia, Portugal
Sportspeople from Aveiro District
Portuguese footballers
Association football midfielders
Primeira Liga players
Liga Portugal 2 players
Segunda Divisão players
Anadia F.C. players
Associação Académica de Coimbra – O.A.F. players
Vitória S.C. players
Cypriot First Division players
AEK Larnaca FC players
Liga I players
Liga II players
FC Brașov (1936) players
Russian First League players
FC Spartak Vladikavkaz players
Portuguese expatriate footballers
Expatriate footballers in Cyprus
Expatriate footballers in Romania
Expatriate footballers in Russia
Portuguese expatriate sportspeople in Cyprus
Portuguese expatriate sportspeople in Romania
Portuguese expatriate sportspeople in Russia